Military drums or war drums are all kinds of drums and membranophones that have been used for martial music, including military communications, as well as drill, honors music and military ceremonies.

History
Among ancient war drums that can be mentioned, junjung was used by the Serer people in West Africa. The Rigveda describes the war drum as the fist of Indra.

In early medieval Europe, the Byzantine Empire made use of military drums to indicate marching and rowing cadence, as well as a psychological weapon on the battlefield since the End of Antiquity. However, in Western Europe, military drums were little observed until the time of the Crusades (p. 19)  Western European armies likely first encountered drums used by Byzantine and Islamic and military forces, the latter who used primarily their traditional kettledrums, and in battle found that the sound would particularly affect Crusaders' horses, who had not previously encountered them. By  the early 13th century, Crusading armies began to adopt military drums and brought back the practice to the West.

The snare drum in particular began to be used in 13th Century Europe to rally troops, and to demoralize the enemy.

A military tattoo was originally a drum signal for soldiers' curfew. Other uses for military drums have been recruiting and calling for parley.

Ancient Fife and Drum Corps, as well as modern drum corps have been used by early modern armies for signalling and ceremonies, occasionally played by drummer boys in conflicts such as the American Civil War.

Over a period of time, Snare drums, as well as timpani, have been adopted into civilian classical and popular music.

Metaphor
In modern times, the term war drums is used as a metaphor for preparation for war.

See also
 Drummer (military)
 Fife (instrument)
 Carnyx
 Field music (military)
 March (music)
 Marching percussion

References

Drums
Membranophones
Battle drums
Military music
Military equipment